Shlomo Scharf (born 1 January 1943) is an Israeli former football player and manager who works as a commentator on Israeli Sport 5 TV channel. Scharf managed Maccabi Haifa to three championships, and was Israel national football team manager from 1992 to 1999.

Managerial career

Scharf managed the Israel national team from 1992 to 1999 during which time Israel beat France 3–2 in an away game, and his contract was repeatedly extended due to his improvements. Further international victories were achieved against Poland and Bulgaria whilst qualifying for the European Championships and World Cup (France) respectively. Israel's most notable victory under his reign is regarded to be his 5–0 win against Austria.

Major losses were during two home games against Cyprus, and losing to Denmark in the Euro 2000 playoffs which ended his tenure as manager.

After briefly coaching the teams Maccabi Tel Aviv and Hapoel Be'er Sheva, he retired.

Punditry
Since his retirement from managing Scharf works as a pundit on Israeli football for local media and national television. In November 2020, he was suspended by Sports Channel for a racist remark about Black footballer.

Honours

As a Player
 Israeli Second Division: 1966–68; runner-up 1965–66

As a Manager
 Israeli Premier League: 1983–84, 1984–85, 1990–91; runner-up 1980–81, 1985–86
 Israel State Cup: 1975, 1980, 1981, 1991; runner-up 1985, 1987
 Israeli Supercup: 1985
 UEFA Intertoto Cup: 1985

References

1942 births
Living people
Israeli footballers
Israeli football managers
People from Biysk
Footballers from Kfar Saba
Hapoel Kfar Saba F.C. players
Bnei Yehuda Tel Aviv F.C. managers
Maccabi Haifa F.C. managers
Israel national football team managers
Maccabi Tel Aviv F.C. managers
Hapoel Be'er Sheva F.C. managers
Israeli Premier League managers
Israeli people of Polish-Jewish descent
Association footballers not categorized by position